The Billmeyer House, also known as York House, is a historic home located at York, Pennsylvania, York County, Pennsylvania.  It was built in 1860, and is a three-story, brick Italian Villa style dwelling.  It consists of a "head house" with rear wing, and topped by flat roof with a 10 feet square cupola.  The interior features a parlor ceiling and walls decorated by noted artist Filippo Costaggini (1839–1904).

It was added to the National Register of Historic Places in 1970.

See also
National Register of Historic Places listings in York County, Pennsylvania

References

External links
Historic York website

Historic American Buildings Survey in Pennsylvania
Houses on the National Register of Historic Places in Pennsylvania
Italianate architecture in Pennsylvania
Houses completed in 1860
Houses in York County, Pennsylvania
Buildings and structures in York, Pennsylvania
National Register of Historic Places in York County, Pennsylvania